The English comic singer, monologist and actor Stanley Holloway (1890–1982), started his performing career in 1910. He starred in English seaside towns such as Clacton-on-Sea and Walton-on-the-Naze, primarily in concert party and variety shows.  The first of these, The White Coons Show, was soon followed by the more prestigious Nicely, Thanks! in 1913.  From here, he went on to co-star in The Co-Optimists, a variety show which brought him to wider audience attention. After the First World War, he returned to London and found success in the West End musicals at the Winter Garden Theatre, including Kissing Time (1919), followed in 1920 by A Night Out. The Co-Optimists continued until 1927, and he then appeared in Hit the Deck, a comic musical which appeared both in London and on Broadway.  Reporting for The Manchester Guardian, the theatre critic Ivor Brown praised Holloway for a singing style "which coaxes the ear rather than clubbing the head."

In between his stage roles, Holloway had a successful film career.  He made his silent film debut in 1921 in The Rotters and went on to star in over 60 motion pictures, with his last being in 1976. His credits covered many genres including drama, romance and comedy and he shared successful collaborations with a number of studios, including Gaumont-British Picture Corporation, Gainsborough Studios and, most notably, Ealing Studios. He started his association with Ealing in 1934, appearing in the fifth Gracie Fields picture, Sing As We Go. After a ten-year absence from the studios, Holloway returned to star in Champagne Charlie in 1944 alongside Tommy Trinder and went on to star in Nicholas Nickleby (1947) and Another Shore (1948). However, it was the next three Ealing Comedies, Passport to Pimlico (1949), The Lavender Hill Mob (1951) and The Titfield Thunderbolt (1953), which confirmed Holloway as a mainstay of British cinema. His final film with the studio was Meet Mr. Lucifer (1953).

In 1956, Holloway revived his flagging career, creating the role of Alfred P. Doolittle in the extraordinarily successful original Broadway production of My Fair Lady, which was made into a hit film in 1964 with Holloway in the same role. Owing to the film's success, he was able to get good roles in more films, including Mrs. Brown, You've Got a Lovely Daughter alongside Herman's Hermits. His films in the early 1970s included The Private Life of Sherlock Holmes, Flight of the Doves and Up the Front.  His final film was Journey into Fear, released in 1976.

Stage shows

Film

Television

See also
 Songs and monologues of Stanley Holloway

References

Bibliography 

Male actor filmographies
British filmographies